Science Reporter  is a monthly popular science magazine that has been published in India since 1964 by the National Institute of Science Communication and Information Resources, a government agency based in New Delhi. It is published in English and is read principally in India and neighbouring countries.

The magazine was originally intended to make citizens aware of the research taking place in various scientific institutions in the country. It has now outgrown this initial agenda, becoming a popular science magazine that covers many national and international science issues. There are reports of current interest, as well as essays written by eminent national scientists on modern technologies, the country's science policy, and the like. Regular columns on science fiction, puzzles, hobby projects, crosswords are also present.

Open Access
The journal is available under open access after six months of the print publication.

References

1964 establishments in Delhi
English-language magazines published in India
Magazines established in 1964
Magazines published in Delhi
Monthly magazines published in India
National Institute of Science Communication and Information Resources academic journals
Popular science magazines
Science and technology magazines published in India